Stellaria pungens, commonly known as prickly starwort, is a flowering plant in the family Caryophyllaceae and is endemic to eastern Australia. It is a small, mat forming perennial with white star-shaped flowers and small sharply pointed, bright green leaves.

Description
Stellaria pungens is a sprawling or prostrate, mat forming perennial forb with angular stems that may be smooth or with occasional hairs. The sepals are more less as long as the petals, pointed, edges dry, thin and flexible. Flowering occurs from October to December.

Taxonomy
Stellaria pungens was first formally described in 1834 by Adolphe-Théodore Brongniart and the description was published in Voyage Autour du Monde. Botanique.

Distribution and habitat
Prickly starwort is a moderately common species growing in steep, rocky or shaded sites in woodland in New South Wales, Victoria, Tasmania and South Australia.

References

pungens
Flora of New South Wales
Flora of Tasmania
Flora of Victoria (Australia)
Flora of South Australia
Taxa named by Adolphe-Théodore Brongniart